Arne Settergren (born 17 March 1935) is a Swedish former sailor who competed in the 1964 Summer Olympics.

References

1935 births
Living people
Swedish male sailors (sport)
Olympic sailors of Sweden
Sailors at the 1964 Summer Olympics – Dragon
Place of birth missing (living people)